This is page shows results of Canadian federal elections in Greater Vancouver and the Sunshine Coast.

Regional profile
The city of Vancouver, along with the inner suburbs south of Burrard Inlet, tend to be very liberal and have always been heavily supportive of the New Democratic Party and Liberals. This is primarily due to a sense of liberal activism in the area (including strong support for same-sex marriage and the legalization of marijuana). Unsurprisingly, the more affluent inner city ridings in the west (Centre, Quadra) tend to favour the Liberals, while the relatively poorer eastern inner city ridings (East, Kingsway) are more supportive of the NDP. The outer suburbs farther east and north of Burrard Inlet tend to lean more in the conservative direction, although primarily only on economic issues; historically the eastern ridings were NDP strongholds until the rise of the Reform Party. Since then, the former Reform and Canadian Alliance parties did very well in those regions, although it has not necessarily translated into stronger results for the current Conservatives, who lost one seat and saw their margin decrease substantially in their three remaining seats. Vancouver houses most of the few seats in the province where the Liberals consistently do well.

In 2015, however, Conservative support in Vancouver melted.  The Liberals took eight seats, including all but two in Vancouver itself, while the NDP won the other five--the first time since 1968 that there were no centre-right MPs from Greater Vancouver. The Conservatives managed to retake one suburban riding in 2019, while Liberal-turned-independent Jody Wilson-Raybould retained her Vancouver seat.

2019 - 43rd General Election 

|-
| style="background-color:whitesmoke" |Burnaby North—Seymour
||
|Terry Beech17,77035.50%
|
|Heather Leung9,73419.45%
|
|Svend Robinson16,18532.33%
|
|Amita Kuttner4,8019.59%
|
|Rocky Dong1,0792.16%
|
|Lewis Clarke Dahlby (Libert.)2190.44%Robert Taylor (Ind.)2710.54%
||
|Terry Beech
|-
| style="background-color:whitesmoke" |Burnaby South
|
|Neelam Brar10,70623.79%
|
|Jay Shin13,91430.92%
||
|Jagmeet Singh16,95637.67%
|
|Brennan Wauters2,4775.50%
|
|Al Rawdah6451.43%
|
|Rex Brocki (Libert.)2460.55%Brian Sproule (M-L)620.14%
||
|Jagmeet Singh
|-
| style="background-color:whitesmoke" |Coquitlam—Port Coquitlam
||
|Ron McKinnon20,17834.69%
|
|Nicholas Insley19,78834.01%
|
|Christina Gower13,38323.00%
|
|Brad Nickason4,0256.92%
|
|Roland Spornicu7031.21%
|
|Dan Iova (VCP)980.17%
||
|Ron McKinnon
|-
| style="background-color:whitesmoke" |New Westminster—Burnaby
|
|Will Davis12,41423.43%
|
|Megan Veck11,43921.59%
||
|Peter Julian23,43744.24%
|
|Suzanne de Montigny4,3788.26%
|
|Hansen Ginn8621.63%
|
|Neeraj Murarka (Libert.)3070.58%Ahmad Passyar (Ind.)830.16%Joseph Theriault (M-L)570.11%
||
|Peter Julian
|-
| style="background-color:whitesmoke" |North Vancouver
||
|Jonathan Wilkinson26,97942.87%
|
|Andrew Saxton16,90826.87%
|
|Justine Bell10,34016.43%
|
|George Orr7,86812.50%
|
|Azmairnin Jadavji8351.33%
|
|
||
|Jonathan Wilkinson
|-
| style="background-color:whitesmoke" |Port Moody—Coquitlam
|
|Sara Badiei15,69529.06%
||
|Nelly Shin16,85531.21%
|
|Bonita Zarrillo16,70230.93%
|
|Bryce Watts3,8737.17%
|
|Jayson Chabot8211.52%
|
|Roland Verrier (M-L)570.11%
||
|Fin Donnelly†
|-
| style="background-color:whitesmoke" |Vancouver Centre
||
|Hedy Fry23,59942.18%
|
|David Cavey10,78219.27%
|
|Breen Ouellette13,28023.74%
|
|Jesse Brown7,00212.52%
|
|Louise Kierans7241.29%
|
|Lily Bowman (Ind.)1420.25%John Clarke (Libert.)3790.68%Imtiaz Popat (Ind.)380.07%
||
|Hedy Fry
|-
| style="background-color:whitesmoke" |Vancouver East
|
|Kyle Demes10,08518.13%
|
|Chris Corsetti6,72412.09%
||
|Jenny Kwan29,23652.57%
|
|Bridget Burns8,06214.50%
|
|Karin Litzcke6791.22%
|
|Gölök Z Buday (Libert.)5621.01%Anne Jamieson (M-L)860.15%Peter Marcus (Comm.)1770.32%
||
|Jenny Kwan
|-
| style="background-color:whitesmoke" |Vancouver Granville
|
|Taleeb Noormohamed14,08826.57%
|
|Zach Segal11,60521.88%
|
|Yvonne Hanson6,96013.12%
|
|Louise Boutin2,6835.06%
|
|Naomi Chocyk4310.81%
||
|Jody Wilson-Raybould (Ind.)17,26532.56%
||
|Jody Wilson-Raybould
|-
| style="background-color:whitesmoke" |Vancouver Kingsway
|
|Tamara Taggart10,19423.08%
|
|Helen Quan8,80419.94%
||
|Don Davies21,68049.09%
|
|Lawrence Taylor2,6756.06%
|
|Ian Torn4270.97%
|
|Kimball Cariou (Comm.)2920.66%Donna Peterson (M-L)910.21%
||
|Don Davies
|-
| style="background-color:whitesmoke" |Vancouver Quadra
||
|Joyce Murray22,09343.53%
|
|Kathleen Dixon14,08227.75%
|
|Leigh Kenny7,68115.13%
|
|Geoff Wright6,30812.43%
|
|Sandra Filosof-Schipper4280.84%
|
|Austen Erhardt (Ind.)1620.32%
||
|Joyce Murray
|-
| style="background-color:whitesmoke" |Vancouver South
||
|Harjit S. Sajjan17,80841.23%
|
|Wai Young14,38833.31%
|
|Sean McQuillan8,01518.56%
|
|Judy Zaichkowsky2,4515.67%
|
|Alain Deng5321.23%
|
|
||
|Harjit Sajjan
|-
| style="background-color:whitesmoke" |West Vancouver—Sunshine Coast—Sea to Sky Country
||
|Patrick Weiler22,67334.89%
|
|Gabrielle Loren17,35926.71%
|
|Judith Wilson9,02713.89%
|
|Dana Taylor14,57922.44%
|
|Robert Douglas Bebb1,0101.55%
|
|Terry Grimwood (Ind.)1590.24%Gordon Jeffrey (Rhino.)1730.27%
||
|Pamela Goldsmith-Jones†$
|}<noinclude>

2015 - 42nd General Election

2011 - 41st General Election

2008 - 40th General Election

2006 - 39th General Election

2004 - 38th General Election

2000 - 37th General Election

Notes

References 

Political history of British Columbia
Vancouver, Greater